Eden Charles (born 29 October 1993) is a Saint Lucian international footballer who plays as a striker for Monchy United.

Club career
Charles has played for Northern United All Stars of the Saint Lucia Gold Division since 2009. In 2012, he, along with fellow-Saint Lucian Jamil Joseph, trialed at Carlisle United FC of League One as part of an agreement between the Saint Lucia Football Association and the club.

In December 2013, it was announced that Charles would participate in the 2014 Caribbean Combine, with hopes of participating in the 2014 MLS SuperDraft. Charles then played in the TT Pro League in Trinidad & Tobago for W Connection.

International career
He made his international debut for Saint Lucia on 12 July 2011 in a 2014 FIFA World Cup qualification match against Aruba and would score his first international goal in a 2012 Caribbean Cup qualifier against Curaçao.

International goals
Scores and results list Saint Lucia's goal tally first.

References

External links

1993 births
Living people
People from Gros Islet Quarter
Saint Lucian footballers
Saint Lucia international footballers
Association football forwards
Northern United All Stars players
W Connection F.C. players
Morvant Caledonia United players
Expatriate footballers in Trinidad and Tobago